The following are units which operated the Bristol Blenheim:

Operators

Australia
Royal Australian Air Force
No. 454 Squadron RAAF
No. 459 Squadron RAAF

Canada
Royal Canadian Air Force
Article XV squadrons serving under direct command and control of the RAF, with RAF owned aircraft.
No. 404 Squadron RCAF used Blenheim IVF (Apr 41 - Jan 43) with Coastal Command.
No. 406 Squadron RCAF used Blenheim I and IV (May 41 - Jun 41) as night fighters.
No. 407 Squadron RCAF used Blenheim IV (May 41  - Jul 41) while working up to operational status with Coastal Command.

Independent State of Croatia
Zrakoplovstvo Nezavisne Države Hrvatske
Eight captured ex-Royal Yugoslav Air Force Mk I aircraft were acquired by the ZNDH from the Germans after the April invasion in 1941. Several survived to the end of the War, with one retreating to Klagenfurt Austria upon the collapse of the Independent State of Croatia (NDH) in May 1945.

Finland

Finnish Air Force
Finland was the first export order for the Blenheim and 18 Mark Is were delivered between 29 July 1937 and 27 July 1938. A licence to local produce the aircraft was granted in April 1938 but none of the 15 ordered from State Aircraft Factory were delivered before the Russian invasion. Twelve new Mark IVs were diverted from RAF production and these were followed by 12 former RAF Mark Is.
No. 41 Squadron
No. 42 Squadron
No. 43 Squadron
No. 44 Squadron
No. 45 Squadron
No. 46 Squadron
No. 48 Squadron

Free France
Free French Air Force
No. 342 Squadron RAF

Nazi Germany
Luftwaffe
One damaged Blenheim Mk IV was captured during Battle of France in 1940. It was later repaired and used as special training aircraft from 1940 until 1942.

Greece
Hellenic Air Force
The Hellenic Air Force in its campaigns against Italy and Germany in 1940 and 1941, operated 12 Mk IVs (delivered before WWII without sights, bomb racks, wireless radios and intercoms) and 6 Mk Is (delivered in February 1941). In the Middle East, the Hellenic Air Force operated 19 Mk IVs (from January 1942 till January 1943) and 31 Mk Vs (from January 1943 till September 1943).

India
Royal Indian Air Force

Indonesia
Indonesian Air Force
One Blenheim Mk IV was captured during the Indonesian National Revolution from the IJAAF. It was re-engined with Nakajima Sakae engines.

Italy
Regia Aeronautica
Blenheim Mk.IV N3589 of No. 40 Squadron RAF landed in error at Pantelleria on 13 September 1940 and was evaluated at Guidonia airfield near Rome. One more was captured in Yugoslavia while two were seized in Italian East Africa but were recaptured when this territory fell into British hands. N3589 might be the Mk.IV appearing in a non-flying role in the movie Un Pilota Ritorna (1942) directed by Roberto Rossellini.

Japan
Imperial Japanese Army Air Service
At least one Blenheim Mk I and two Blenheim Mk IV wrecks were discovered in Semarang, Java in August 1947. It was either captured during the Malayan campaign or the Dutch East Indies campaign.

New Zealand
Royal New Zealand Air Force
No. 489 Squadron RNZAF

Poland
Polish Air Forces in Great Britain
No. 307 Polish Night Fighter Squadron operated four aircraft of Mk Is and Mk IVs variants as trainers and hacks.
One Blenheim IV rebuild to VIP transport variant was used as personal transport aircraft of the General Władysław Anders, commander of 2nd Polish Corps

Portugal
Portuguese Air Force
Portuguese Naval Aviation

Romania
Romanian Air Force
Germany provided 6 captured ex-Royal Yugoslav Air Force Mk I aircraft to Romania in 1941, where they joined 12 Mk Is previously purchased from Britain.

South Africa
South African Air Force
No. 15 Squadron SAAF

Turkey
Turkish Air Force

United Kingdom
Royal Air Force
No. 6 Squadron RAF
No. 8 Squadron RAF
No. 11 Squadron RAF
No. 13 Squadron RAF
No. 14 Squadron RAF
No. 15 Squadron RAF
No. 17 Squadron RAF
No. 18 Squadron RAF
No. 20 Squadron RAF
No. 21 Squadron RAF
No. 23 Squadron RAF
No. 25 Squadron RAF
No. 27 Squadron RAF
No. 29 Squadron RAF
No. 30 Squadron RAF
No. 34 Squadron RAF
No. 35 Squadron RAF
No. 39 Squadron RAF
No. 40 Squadron RAF
No. 42 Squadron RAF
No. 44 Squadron RAF
No. 45 Squadron RAF
No. 52 Squadron RAF
No. 53 Squadron RAF
No. 55 Squadron RAF
No. 57 Squadron RAF
No. 59 Squadron RAF
No. 60 Squadron RAF
No. 61 Squadron RAF
No. 62 Squadron RAF
No. 64 Squadron RAF
No. 68 Squadron RAF
No. 82 Squadron RAF
No. 84 Squadron RAF
No. 86 Squadron RAF
No. 88 Squadron RAF
No. 90 Squadron RAF
No. 92 Squadron RAF
No. 101 Squadron RAF
No. 103 Squadron RAF
No. 104 Squadron RAF
No. 105 Squadron RAF
No. 107 Squadron RAF
No. 108 Squadron RAF
No. 110 Squadron RAF
No. 113 Squadron RAF
No. 114 Squadron RAF
No. 139 Squadron RAF
No. 140 Squadron RAF
No. 141 Squadron RAF
No. 142 Squadron RAF
No. 143 Squadron RAF
No. 144 Squadron RAF
No. 145 Squadron RAF
No. 150 Squadron RAF
No. 162 Squadron RAF
No. 173 Squadron RAF
No. 203 Squadron RAF
No. 211 Squadron RAF
No. 212 Squadron RAF
No. 218 Squadron RAF
No. 219 Squadron RAF
No. 222 Squadron RAF
No. 223 Squadron RAF
no. 224 Squadron RAF
No. 226 Squadron RAF
No. 229 Squadron RAF
No. 233 Squadron RAF
No. 234 Squadron RAF
No. 235 Squadron RAF
No. 236 Squadron RAF
No. 242 Squadron RAF
No. 244 Squadron RAF
No. 245 Squadron RAF
No. 248 Squadron RAF
No. 252 Squadron RAF
No. 254 Squadron RAF
No. 267 Squadron RAF
No. 272 Squadron RAF
No. 285 Squadron RAF
No. 287 Squadron RAF
No. 288 Squadron RAF
No. 289 Squadron RAF
No. 353 Squadron RAF
No. 500 Squadron RAF
No. 516 Squadron RAF
No. 521 Squadron RAF
No. 526 Squadron RAF
No. 527 Squadron RAF
No. 528 Squadron RAF
No. 600 Squadron RAF
No. 601 Squadron RAF
No. 604 Squadron RAF
No. 608 Squadron RAF
No. 614 Squadron RAF

Fleet Air Arm
748 Naval Air Squadron
759 Naval Air Squadron
762 Naval Air Squadron
770 Naval Air Squadron
771 Naval Air Squadron
772 Naval Air Squadron
775 Naval Air Squadron
776 Naval Air Squadron
780 Naval Air Squadron
787 Naval Air Squadron
788 Naval Air Squadron
798 Naval Air Squadron
Aeroplane & Armament Experimental Establishment
Royal Aircraft Establishment

Yugoslavia
Royal Yugoslav Air Force
The Royal Yugoslav Air Force acquired 24 Mk I aircraft from RAF stocks and subsequently undertook a licensed production run of some 36 aircraft. Tooling up for the production of the Mk IV was about to commence when interrupted by the Invasion of Yugoslavia in April 1941. Some 20 partly completed airframes, as well as production tools and spare parts were subsequently sold by Germany to Finland.

See also
Bristol Blenheim

References

Notes

Bibliography
 Bączkowski, W. Samolot bombowy Bristol Blenheim Mk.I-IV, Typy Broni I Uzbrojenia, No.171 (in Polish). Warsaw, Poland: Bellona SA, 1995. 
 Boiten, T. Bristol Blenheim. London: The Crowood Press, 1998. .
 Bowyer, C. Bristol Blenheim. London: Ian Allan, 1984. .
 Jefford, C.G. RAF Squadrons, a Comprehensive record of the Movement and Equipment of all RAF Squadrons and their Antecedents since 1912. Shrewsbury, Shropshire, UK: Airlife Publishing, 1988 (second edition 2001). .
 Keskinen, Kalevi et al. Suomen Ilmavoimien Historia 10, Bristol Blenheim (in Finnish). Loviisa, Finland: Painoyhtymä Oy, 2004. .
 Kostenuk, S. and J. Griffin. RCAF Squadron Histories and Aircraft: 1924–1968. Toronto: Samuel Stevens, Hakkert & Company, 1977. .
 Lake, Jon. Blenheim Squadrons of World War II. London: Osprey Publishing, 1998. .
 Likso, T. and D. Canak. Hrvatsko Ratno Zrakoplovstvo u Drugome Svjetskom Ratu (The Croatian Airforce in the Second World War). Zagreb, 1998. .
 Mackay, Ron. Bristol Blenheim in Action. Carrollton, Texas: Squadron/Signal Publications, 1998. .
 March, Daniel J., ed. British Warplanes of World War II. London: Aerospace, 1998. .
 Marttila, Jukka. Bristol Blenheim - Taitoa ja tekniikkaa (in Finnish). Vantaa, Finland: Blenimi-Publishing, 1989. .
 Mason, Francis K. The British Bomber Since 1914. London: Putnam Aeronautical Books, 1994. .
 Neulen, H.W. In the Skies of Europe – Air Forces allied to the Luftwaffe 1939-1945. Wiltshire, UK: Crowood Press, 2000. .
 Savic, Dragan and Boris Ciglic. Croatian Aces of World War II (Osprey Aircraft of the Aces - 49). Oxford, Osprey, 2002. .
 Shores, C., B. Cull and N. Malizia. Air War for Yugoslavia, Greece & Crete – 1940-41. London: Grub Street, 1987. .
 Thomas, A. Bristol Blenheim (Warpaint No. 26). Denbigh East, Bletchley, UK: Hall Park Books, 2000. .
 Warner, G. The Bristol Blenheim: A Complete History. London: Crécy Publishing, 2nd edition 2005. .

Lists of military units and formations by aircraft
Blenheim